Vrooom Vrooom is a live two CD set by the band King Crimson, recorded in 1995 & 1996, and released in 2001. It features the six member “double trio” lineup of the band, with guitarists Robert Fripp and Adrian Belew, bassists Tony Levin and Trey Gunn, and drummers Bill Bruford and Pat Mastelotto.

This album was intended as a wider commercial release of two previous releases which had been made available on more limited media in 1999.

Disc one was taken predominantly from the same recordings as the 1999 live album Live in Mexico City (originally made available exclusively as a Windows Media Audio download). The eleventh track on the disc, "Biker Babes of the Rio Grande", is an alternative version of the track "Fearless and Highly Thrakked", featured on Thrakattak (1996) (track 2) and King Crimson on Broadway (2-CD set) (1999) (disc 2, track 12). Disc two was derived mostly from the same recordings as the 1999 live album King Crimson on Broadway, originally released as the July 1999 release in the then subscriber-only King Crimson Collectors' Club.

Track listing

Disc one
Recorded at the Teatro Metropólitan, Mexico City, Mexico, 2–4 August 1996
"Vrooom Vrooom" (Adrian Belew, Bill Bruford, Robert Fripp, Trey Gunn, Tony Levin, Pat Mastelotto) – 5:01
"Coda: Marine 475" (Belew, Bruford, Fripp, Gunn, Levin, Mastelotto) – 2:44
"Dinosaur" (Belew, Bruford, Fripp, Gunn, Levin, Mastelotto) – 5:05
"B'Boom" (Belew, Bruford, Fripp, Gunn, Levin, Mastelotto) – 4:51
"THRAK" (Belew, Bruford, Fripp, Gunn, Levin, Mastelotto) – 6:39
"The Talking Drum" (Bruford, David Cross (musician), Fripp, Jamie Muir, John Wetton) – 4:03
"Larks' Tongues in Aspic (Part II)" (Fripp) – 6:13
"Neurotica" (Belew, Bruford, Fripp, Levin) – 3:40
"Prism" (Pierre Favre) – 4:24
"Red" (Fripp) – 7:03
"Improv: Biker Babes of the Rio Grande" (Belew, Bruford, Fripp, Gunn, Levin, Mastelotto) – 2:27
"21st Century Schizoid Man" (Fripp, Michael Giles, Greg Lake, Ian McDonald, Peter Sinfield) – 7:37

Disc two
Tracks 1-13 recorded at the Longacre Theater, New York City, New York, United States, 20-22/24–25 November 1995
Track 14 recorded at the Wiltern Theatre, Los Angeles, United States, 30 June 1995
"Conundrum" (Belew, Bruford, Fripp, Gunn, Levin, Mastelotto) – 1:57
"Thela Hun Ginjeet" (Belew, Bruford, Fripp, Levin) – 6:44
"Frame by Frame" (Belew, Bruford, Fripp, Levin) – 5:12
"People" (Belew, Bruford, Fripp, Gunn, Levin, Mastelotto) – 6:12
"One Time" (Belew, Bruford, Fripp, Gunn, Levin, Mastelotto) – 5:52
"Sex Sleep Eat Drink Dream" (Belew, Bruford, Fripp, Gunn, Levin, Mastelotto) – 4:55
"Indiscipline" (Belew, Bruford, Fripp, Levin) – 7:16
"Improv: Two Sticks" (Gunn, Levin) – 1:50
"Elephant Talk" (Belew, Bruford, Fripp, Levin) – 5:14
"Three of a Perfect Pair" (Belew, Bruford, Fripp, Levin) – 4:16
"B'Boom" (Belew, Bruford, Fripp, Gunn, Levin, Mastelotto) – 3:47
"THRAK" (Belew, Bruford, Fripp, Gunn, Levin, Mastelotto) – 6:43
"Free as a Bird" (John Lennon) – 3:03
"Walking on Air" (Belew, Bruford, Fripp, Gunn, Levin, Mastelotto) – 5:35

Personnel
Robert Fripp – guitar
Adrian Belew – guitar, vocals
Tony Levin – bass guitar, electric double bass, Chapman stick, backing vocals
Trey Gunn – warr guitar
Bill Bruford – drums, percussion
Pat Mastelotto – drums, percussion

References

2001 live albums
King Crimson live albums
Discipline Global Mobile albums